Fall River State Park is a state park in Greenwood County, Kansas USA, southwest of the city of Toronto. The state park features six different hiking trails including Casner Creek, Turkey Run, Post Oak, Overlook, Bluestem, and Catclaw.

Activities at Fall River State Park include camping, hiking, picnicking, swimming, and boating and water skiing down the  Fall River for which the state park is named.

See also
 Fall River Lake
 List of Kansas state parks
 List of lakes, reservoirs, and dams in Kansas
 List of rivers of Kansas

References

External links

State parks of Kansas
Protected areas of Greenwood County, Kansas